The El Deposito (lit: The Deposit) is an old underground water reservoir in the city of San Juan in Metro Manila, Philippines. It was built by the Spanish authorities in 1880 with a capacity of 15 million gallons to provide the residents of Manila and its surrounding areas with an adequate water supply. The reservoir was historically known as the site where the onset of the Philippine Revolution through the Battle of San Juan del Monte took place in 1896.

History
The El Deposito was built as part of the Carriedo Waterworks which was built from 1878 to 1882 under the supervision of Genaro Palacios, a Spanish engineer and architect who also decided to use the Marikina River as the El Deposito's water source.

The underground reservoir held military strategic importance. During the Philippine Revolution, the Katipunan attempted to seize the El Deposito from Spanish colonial authorities in the Battle of San Juan del Monte in 1896 and was held by Filipinos during the Philippine-American war. It was used as an armory; by the Americans during the colonial administration, and by the Imperial Japanese forces during their occupation of the Philippines in World War II. It was also used as a pulmonary hospital specifically for tuberculosis patients and as a firing range. El Deposito was recaptured by the Allied forces in 1945 but later fell to disuse after the war and the Philippine independence from the United States.

Efforts to rehabilitate the underground reservoir began in 2016 when the University of the Philippines Archaeological Studies program conducted an assessment and excavation of the structure. The National Historical Commission of the Philippines conducted cleaning of the El Deposito's tunnel in 2018 as a preparation for the development of the site as a tourist destination It is planned to be open to the public in 2020.

Water supply
Ventilation shaft were also utilized to keep water fresh and free from contamination. As part of the Carriedo waterworks system, the reservoir also supplied water to hydrants and fountains in Manila.

As part of the Carriedo water system, the El Deposito sources its water from the Marikina River. Water was pumped out from the river to the water reservoir through a  cast iron pipes which passes through the Santolan area.

Cultural Property

On August 30, 1972, a marker was installed by the National Historical Commission of the Philippines in recognition of the old reservoir as a cultural property.  In commemoration of the first battle of the Philippine Revolution, the land along El Deposito was converted into a recreational park named the Pinaglabanan Memorial Shrine and Park.

References

Buildings and structures in San Juan, Metro Manila
Industrial buildings completed in 1880
Water supply and sanitation in Metro Manila
Former buildings and structures in Metro Manila
1880 establishments in the Philippines
19th-century architecture in the Philippines